West Valley High School is a high school that serves around 1,800 students on the western side of Hemet, California.  The school is accredited by the WASC Accrediting Commission for Schools and also has become an AVID Demonstration School. The West Valley High School mascot is a Mustang.

History

West Valley High School was created in 1989 to accommodate the growing population of Hemet, California. The student and teacher population of Hemet Junior High (closed in 1990) worked to create a name, mascot and colors (maroon and gray) for the school. West Valley opened in the fall of 1990 to freshman and sophomores only. It expanded to Juniors the following year and graduated its first class of Seniors on June 17, 1993.

The school moved to a brand new facility on the west end of Hemet in 1996. In 2006 the football field was upgraded to artificial turf and the originally planned pool was also completed. In 2017 the football field underwent renovations.

West Valley High School offers the International Baccalaureate program otherwise known as "IB".

References

External links
 West Valley High School Official Site
 Academic decathlon
 West Valley United Nations Project
 

Hemet, California
High schools in Riverside County, California
Public high schools in California
1989 establishments in California